Knobstick may refer to:
Strikebreaker or blackleg, a derogatory archaic term for a worker who is not part of a union and works when others are striking
 A weapon, a short stick with a knob at the top traditionally used by the indigenous peoples of South Africa. From the Afrikaans knopkierie
The Knobstick, an 1893 novel by C. Allen Clarke

See also
 Knobstick wedding, a forced marriage of a pregnant single woman with the man known or believed to be the father